Ann Wyley (or Wiley; died March 26, 1777) was a slave hanged for burglary in Detroit, at the time part of the British Province of Quebec. She is the only black person and one of the only two women known to have been legally executed in Michigan, and the only woman whose identity is known.

Wyley was co-owned by James Abbott and Thomas Finchley, two businessmen in the fur trade who operated a store in the vicinity of Fort Detroit. It is not known when or how she came to be in their possession. In mid-1774, Wyley was charged with stealing a collection of items from her slave owners, including a purse containing six guineas, a handkerchief, two pairs of women's shoes, and a piece of flannel. Another of the firm's laborers, Jean Contencineau (probably an indentured servant), was also charged as an accomplice, while a third worker, Charles Landry, confessed to involvement but was let free; the two men had both stolen beaver, otter, and raccoon skins. Wyley and Contencineau were additionally charged with arson, as they were alleged to have lit a fire to cover their traces.

After their arrest, Wyley and Contencineau did not face trial until mid-1776, spending that time imprisoned in Fort Detroit. The town notary and justice of the peace, Philippe DeJean, granted the pair a jury trial. They were acquitted of arson, as there was only circumstantial evidence, but found guilty of the burglary; Contencineau had testified that Wyley was the "mastermind" of their scheme. As the fort had suffered a recent spate of petty thefts, DeJean wished to make an example of them. He sentenced them to death, a decision ratified by Lieutenant-Governor Henry Hamilton. Wyley and Contencineau were publicly hanged on March 27, 1777. According to some sources, DeJean offered to pardon Wyley if she performed Contencineau's execution herself, as no one else was willing to serve as executioner. She did so, "in such a clumsy fashion that the spectators were horrified at the struggles of the victim", but was then hanged anyway.

See also
 Capital punishment in Michigan
 List of people executed in Michigan

References

1777 deaths
18th-century executions of American people
People executed by British North America by hanging
People executed by the Province of Quebec (1763–1791)
Capital punishment in Michigan
18th-century American slaves
People from Detroit
American executioners
American burglars
Executed American women
Executed African-American people
People executed for theft
18th-century African-American women
African-American history of Michigan